Chuck Basye (born June 11, 1958) is an American politician. He is a member of the Missouri House of Representatives, having served since 2014. He is a member of the Republican Party.

Electoral history

State Representative

References

1958 births
21st-century American politicians
Living people
Republican Party members of the Missouri House of Representatives
People from Rocheport, Missouri
Politicians from Kansas City, Missouri